The starburst anemone or sunburst anemone (Anthopleura sola) is a species of sea anemone in the family Actiniidae. The sunburst anemone was formerly considered the solitary form of the common aggregating anemone, but was identified as a separate species in 2000.

Description
The sunburst anemone is a solitary anemone that averages 12 cm but can grow up to 25 cm wide, much larger than the aggregating anemone. 
The column is pale green to white in color and is twice as long as its width when extended. The column has numerous sticky protuberances (verrucae) arranged in vertical rows to which gravel and shell fragments adhere. The oral disc is radially striped and has five rings of thick, pointed feeding tentacles. Tentacles are pale with the tips colored in pink, blue or lavender.

The sunburst anemone can be differentiated from the aggregating anemone by its larger size and usual solitary form. It is differentiated from Anthopleura xanthogrammica by the coloration of the tentacle tips, striped oral disk, and vertical rows of verrucae.

The color of the anemone is partly caused by symbiotic Zooxanthellae in the gastrodermal layer. This species of anemone reproduces sexually.

Distribution and habitat
The sunburst anemone is found in the north west Pacific Ocean. In the United States it occurs between central California and Baja California. It lives in the lower intertidal zone in rocky habitats, often in the shelter of cracks and crevices. When the tide is out it is often concealed by shell fragments and other particles that adhere to it. It also occurs in the subtidal, often in kelp forests, to depths of at least 20 m.

Territorial defense
The sunburst anemone aggressively defends its territory from other anemones which are genetically dissimilar. When it encounters a different genetic colony, the anemones extend specialized tentacles (called acrorhagi). The white tips of acrorhagi have a concentration of stinging cells (nematocytes) and are used solely to deter other colonies from encroaching on their space. The nematocysts sting the ectoderm of the invader, causing tissue necrosis and forcing the competitor to move away. The similar aggregating anemone also possesses acrorhagi.

References

Actiniidae
Animals described in 2000